The butterfly dance is a dance move in which the dancer's legs move like butterfly wings; it can also apply to arm & hand works where you can shape or move them in the same order or other. The move originated from the music genre hip-hop and is also commonly seen in reggae type music. The dance is a female move but male individuals have been seen to execute the move. The Butterfly apparently applies to other various dances {and even poses} that bend, spread, twist, space and so on. Examples are the Charleston, freestyle Leg Wobble/Bopping, Horse Stance, Billy Bounce, Popping, Diversion, Stanky Legg, PSY Gangnam Style Dance, Plié, "Dangerous Moves" and some Shuffles. Sometimes, similar dance moves could be subliminal to the mating ritual.

This dance move originated in the 1970s.

See also
Tha Butterfly, charting single by rap group Way 2 Real h

References

Dance moves
Contemporary dance